The Greater Richmond Transit Company, known locally as GRTC Transit System, is a local government-owned public service company which operates an urban-suburban bus line based in Richmond, Virginia.

GRTC primarily serves the independent city of Richmond and a very small portion of the adjacent counties of Henrico, Hanover, and Chesterfield with a fleet of over 157 diesel-powered and CNG-powered transit buses operating approximately 45 routes.

GRTC uses government-funded equipment and resources principally provided by the Federal Transit Administration (FTA), Virginia Department of Rail and Public Transportation (VDRPT), and local funds. It also maintains equipment and has other affiliations with Petersburg Area Transit, a similar agency which also serves a portion of Chesterfield County.

Ownership and management 
As a public service company, GRTC is owned equally by the City of Richmond and neighboring Chesterfield County. Henrico and Hanover counties currently purchase services from it, but hold no ownership interest.

It is managed by a private transit management company that provides the CEO, COO, and Transportation Manager, as was its predecessor, Virginia Transit Company (VTC).  GRTC itself has 400 employees.

Immediately after GRTC was formed, American Transportation Enterprises, Inc., through a subsidiary, continued to provide management.

Fleet 

142 transit vehicles, 96 CARE vehicles, and 27 support vehicles (vans, wreckers, trucks, SUVs, etc)
95 fixed route transit vehicles use CNG fuel
88 CARE vehicles use CNG fuel 

In June 2020, the GRTC Board of Directors approved to purchase a replacement bus for #2004 that was destroyed during the riots. The bus should be placed into service on the GRTC Pulse route sometime in January 2021. This bus will be a 40 ft Gillig Low Floor CNG BRTPlus model.

In August 2020, the GRTC Board of Directors approved the purchase of 29 buses to replace older buses to keep the fleet in a state of good repair, as well as to keep up with demand increases in the Richmond Area. All 29 of these buses will be 40 ft Gillig Low Floor CNG BRT model. 14 of the buses will be put into service in the 1st Quarter of FY2022, and the last 15 will enter service in the 3rd Quarter of FY2022.

Routes 

GRTC offers convenient and free Park ‘N Ride lots that run along Express service routes to the downtown Business District. All Park ‘N Ride lots are safe, well-lit, and easily accessible. Hop from your car to work, without wearing out yourself or your car!

Glenside/Parham Express - 23x - (Glenside lot) 4100 Glenside Drive, Henrico, VA 23228; (Parham lot) 8525 Fordson Rd, Henrico, VA, 23229 - TEMPORARILY DISCONTINUED EFFECTIVE SEPT 12, 2021. USE 29X! 
Parham Express - 26x - 8525 Fordson Rd, Henrico, VA, 23229 - TEMPORARILY DISCONTINUED EFFECTIVE SEPT 12, 2021. USE 29X! 
Glenside Express - 27x - 4100 Glenside Drive, Henrico, VA 23228 - TEMPORARILY DISCONTINUED EFFECTIVE SEPT 12, 2021. USE 29X! 
White Oak Village Park ’N Ride - 28x - 4521- 4571 S Laburnum Ave, Richmond, VA 23231 - TEMPORARILY DISCONTINUED. USE ROUTE 7A/B! 
Gaskins Express - 29x - 2900 Gaskins Rd, Henrico, VA, 23233 - EFFECTIVE SEPT 12, 2021 
Bon Air Baptist Church Park 'N Ride - 64x - 2531 Buford Rd, Richmond, VA 23235 
Commonwealth 20 - 82x - 4600 Commonwealth Centre Pkwy, Midlothian, VA 23112 
Petersburg Transit Center Park 'N Ride - 95x - 24 S Union St, Petersburg, VA, 23803 
Kings Dominion (Seasonal) - 102x - Ashland lot 109-121 Junction Drive, Ashland, VA, 23005 - TEMPORARILY DISCONTINUED.

Paratransit service 

GRTC Transit System’s CARE and CARE Plus services provide origin-to-destination service under the guidelines of the Americans with Disabilities Act (ADA) for the citizens of the Richmond Region. CARE and CARE Plus provide public transportation access to individuals with disabilities who may not be reasonably able to use GRTC fixed route bus service. All CARE trips are identified as either CARE or CARE Plus service.  CARE and CARE Plus services are available in the City of Richmond, Henrico County, and portions of Chesterfield County.

Facilities 

The GRTC Headquarters and bus garage is located near the intersection of Belt Boulevard and Midlothian Turnpike in South Richmond.

Incidents 
 On September 21, 2007, a woman was struck by a GRTC bus along 8th and Marshall. The women was seriously injured and would later file charges against GRTC.
 On December 5, 2012, a car rear-ended a GRTC bus and caught fire along Broad Street. One person was sent to the hospital.
 On September 24, 2015, A GRTC bus struck a utility pole in the Randolph neighborhood leaving hundreds without power.
 On June 27, 2018, multiple people were injured when an GRTC bus and a car collided head in eastern Henrico County.
 On July 10, 2018, a GRTC bus collided with a pickup truck when it was making a left-hand turn through the dedicated bus lane on West Broad Street, at the intersection of Broad and N Allen Ave.
 On January 5, 2019, a GRTC bus and an SUV collided along Broad Street. Multiple people were injured.
 On March 5, 2019, a GRTC bus was involved in a minor collision with a car along the intersection of Crutchfield and Roanoke.
 On October 8, 2019, a GRTC bus struck and killed a woman along Broad Street. The driver was also taken to the hospital.
 On November 11, 2019, a GRTC bus was involved in a head-on collision along West 33rd Street and Midlothian Turnpike. Four people were injured.
 On February 24, 2020, a man attempted to hijack a GRTC bus along Brook Road and Azalea Ave. The man was later arrested.
 On May 20, 2020, a driver spun out of control and crashed into a GRTC bus along East Broad Street. The driver of the car was killed and three passengers on the bus were injured.
 During the overnight hours of May 29 into May 30, 2020, rioters vandalized and set fire to a GRTC Pulse bus in Downtown Richmond following protests and riots over the murder of George Floyd. There were no passengers or a driver on board at the time. The bus was destroyed in the ensuing protests.

See also 
 GRTC Pulse

References

External links 
 GRTC website
 Virginia Department of Rail and Public Transportation website
 Petersburg Area Transit (PAT) Route Map and other information

 
Companies based in Richmond, Virginia
1860 establishments in Virginia
Transport companies established in 1860
American companies established in 1860